Terastia subjectalis is a moth of the family Crambidae. It occurs across the Indian and south Pacific oceans, including Fiji, Hawaii, Réunion, Okinawa, Samoa, the Society Islands, Sri Lanka and Australia (the Northern Territory, Queensland and Western Australia).

Adults have wavy wings, with a pattern of light and dark brown on each forewing. The hindwings are pale brown with a broad darker margin.

The larvae feed on Erythrina species, including Erythrina monosperma and Erythrina indica. The larvae feed in the pods but also bore in the shoots.

Taxonomy
It has been considered a synonym of Terastia meticulosalis for some time.

External links

Australian Insects

Spilomelinae
Moths of Japan
Moths of Réunion
Moths of Australia
Moths of Sri Lanka
Moths of Oceania
Moths described in 1863